Albertina Ho SH, MH (born in Southeast Maluku January 1, 1960) is a career woman judge at the General Court under the Supreme Court of Indonesia. Albertina became known publicly when she became chairwoman of the presiding judge bribery tax official Gayus Tambunan at the South Jakarta District Court. Because of persistence, rigor and seriousness as female judges, Albertina Ho earned the nickname "Srikandi Hukum" ("legal hero") by some.

References

21st-century Indonesian judges
Indonesian people of Chinese descent
Indonesian Roman Catholics
Living people
1960 births
Place of birth missing (living people)
Women judges